Francis Birch may refer to:

 Francis Birch (cryptographer) (1889–1956), British cryptographer and actor
 Francis Birch (geophysicist) (1903–1992), American geophysicist